The 2014 Campeonato Amazonense de Futebol was the 98th season of Amazonas' top professional football league. The competition began on February 1, and ended on May 24. Nacional won the championship by the 42nd time, while Holanda and Sul América were relegated.

Format

The championship will have the teams split in two groups. On the first round, the teams in each group plays against the other teams in the group. The two best teams from each teams advances to the semifinals. The round final are in two-leg matches.

On the second round, the teams plays against the teams in the other group. The two best from each group advances to the semifinals, and the round finals are in two-leg matches. The winner from first round then plays against the second round winner.

Participating teams

First round

Group A

Results

Group B

Results

Playoffs

Semifinals

First leg

Second leg

Finals

Second round

Group A

Group B

Results

Playoffs

Semifinals

First leg

Second leg

Finals

Championship finals

Final standings

References

Amazonense
Campeonato Amazonense